Cordula Keller (born 21 June 1968) is a German rower. She competed in the women's coxless pair event at the 1988 Summer Olympics.

References

External links
 

1968 births
Living people
German female rowers
Olympic rowers of West Germany
Rowers at the 1988 Summer Olympics
Rowers from Frankfurt